John F. Manning (born April 11, 1961) is an American educator and lawyer. Manning is currently the Morgan and Helen Chu dean and professor of Harvard Law School.

Career
Manning graduated from Harvard College in 1982 and lived in Thayer Hall during his freshman year. He then graduated from Harvard Law School in 1985. Following law school, he served as a law clerk to Judge Robert Bork at the United States Court of Appeals for the District of Columbia Circuit. He then served as a law clerk to Justice Antonin Scalia for the Supreme Court's 1988 term. Manning also worked two stints at the Justice Department's Office of Legal Counsel (OLC) and in the Solicitor General's office. 

He began teaching at Columbia Law School in 1994 and was the Michael I. Sovern Professor of Law. Manning was brought to Harvard Law School by Dean Elena Kagan to help shore up Harvard Law School's expertise in public law; he is an expert in administrative law and a constitutional scholar of textualism. Manning's hiring, along with that of Jack Goldsmith, and Adrian Vermeule, has "helped assuage complaints that Harvard marginalized conservative views." Manning is also an expert on separation of powers issues.
On July 23, 2012, the Supreme Court appointed Manning amicus curiae, in Sebelius v. Auburn Regional Medical Center. He argued the case on December 4, 2012.

On April 30, 2013, Manning was elected to the American Academy of Arts and Sciences.

On January 5, 2017, Martha Minow, then-dean at Harvard Law School, announced that she would be stepping down as dean at the end of the academic year. On June 1, 2017, Manning was formally announced as the law school's next Dean, beginning on July 1, 2017. Manning, a textualist legal scholar, whose selection drew criticism from some progressive and liberal groups, has stated that his academic background "will not affect how he leads the Law School."

Published works
Manning is the coauthor of two leading textbooks:
Hart and Wechsler's The Federal Courts and the Federal System (6th ed. 2009) (with Richard H. Fallon, Jr., Daniel J. Meltzer, and David L. Shapiro).
Legislation and Regulation (2010) (with Matthew C. Stephenson).
He has also written more than thirty law review articles. Some of his most-cited pieces are:
 Constitutional Structure and Judicial Deference to Agency Interpretations of Agency Rules, 96 Colum. L. Rev. 612 (1996)
 Textualism as a Nondelegation Doctrine, 97 Colum. L. Rev. 673 (1997)
The Nondelegation Doctrine as a Canon of Avoidance, 2000 Sup. Ct. Rev. 223 (2000)
Textualism and the Equity of the Statute, 101 Colum. L. Rev. 1 (2001)
 The Absurdity Doctrine, 116 Harv. L. Rev. 2387 (2003)
The Eleventh Amendment and the Reading of Precise Constitutional Texts, 113 Yale L.J. 1663 (2004).
 Nonlegislative Rules, 72 Geo. Wash. L. Rev. 893 (2004).
Textualism and Legislative Intent, 91 Va. L. Rev. 419 (2005).
 What Divides Textualists from Purposivists?, 106 Colum. L. Rev. 70 (2006).
Federalism and the Generality Problem in Constitutional Interpretation, 122 Harv. L. Rev. 2003 (2009).
Competing Presumptions About Statutory Coherence, 74 Fordham L. Rev. 2009 (2006)
Continuity and the Legislative Design, 79 Notre Dame L. Rev. 1863 (2004)

Cases argued in front of the Supreme Court:

Sebelius v. Auburn Regional Medical Center (2012)
American Dredging Company v. Miller (1993)
Security Services, Inc. v. Kmart Corporation (1993)
Williamson v. United States (1993)
Conroy v. Aniskoff (1992)
Federal Communications Commission v. Beach Communications, Inc. (1992)
Parke v. Raley (1992)
Zafiro v. United States (1992)
Barker v. Kansas (1991)

See also 
 List of law clerks of the Supreme Court of the United States (Seat 9)

References

External links
 Harvard Faculty Bio
 John F. Manning, videos at C-SPAN.
 Appearances at U.S. Supreme Court, Oyez.org

1961 births
Living people
Harvard College alumni
Harvard Law School alumni
Law clerks of the Supreme Court of the United States
Columbia Law School faculty
Harvard Law School faculty
American lawyers
American legal scholars
American legal writers
Fellows of the American Academy of Arts and Sciences
Massachusetts Republicans
American scholars of constitutional law
Deans of Harvard Law School